Jérémy Cabot (born 24 July 1991 in Troyes) is a French cyclist, who currently rides for UCI ProTeam .

Major results
2016
 8th Overall Boucles de la Mayenne
2018
 1st  Mountains classification Tour du Limousin
 8th Grand Prix de Wallonie
2019
 1st Paris–Troyes
 3rd Overall Tour du Jura
 3rd Grand Prix des Marbriers
 5th Grand Prix de la ville de Nogent-sur-Oise
2020
 6th Overall La Tropicale Amissa Bongo
2021
 5th Road race, National Road Championships
 7th Mercan'Tour Classic Alpes-Maritimes

Grand Tour general classification results timeline

References

External links

1991 births
Living people
French male cyclists
Sportspeople from Troyes
Cyclists from Grand Est